Assholeparade is a hardcore band from Gainesville, Florida. They have release two LPs and an EP for No Idea Records, as well as some compilation appearances. They have short aggressive songs. Only two of Assholeparade's original members are left in its current 5-piece setup.

Members
Travis Ginn (vocals) - 1995–present
Jon Weisburg (drums) - 1995–present
Matt Sweeting (Guitar) - 1998–present
Tony Marquez (Guitar) - 2004–present
Edward Dimarco (Bass guitar) - 2009–present

Past members
Brian Johnson (Guitar) - 1995 - 2004
Chris Campisi (Bass guitar) - 1995 - 1996
Travis Johnson (Bass) - 1996 - 2002
Drew DeMiao (Guitar) - 1997 - 1998
D-Ron (Bass guitar) - 2002–present

Discography 
Assholeparade/Ansojuan Split 7-inch (Independent Release, 1996)
Assholeparade ST 7-inch (Kurt and Jason, 1997)
Palatka/Assholeparade Split LP (Coalition Records, 1997)
LHIGHVE 8" EP (Deep Six Records, 1998)
Student Ghetto Violence LP / CD (No Idea Records, 1999; reissued as tour edition LP on No Idea Records, 2007)
Say Goodbye 7-inch EP (No Idea Records, 2005)
Embers LP / CD (No Idea Records, 2006)
Welcome Fucking Home 7-inch (No Idea Records, 2009)
Live in Rostock 10-inch (To Live A Lie Records, 2011)
Assholeparade/Slight Slappers Split LP (No Idea Records, 2011)
Demo 2020 Cassette (Belladonna, 2020)

Compilation appearances
Various Artists, Southeast Hardcore, F*ck Yeah!! 7-inch (Kurt and Jason, 1997 )
Various Artists, Possessed To Skate CD/Vinyl (625 Thrashcore, Pessimer Records, Theologian Records, 1997 )
Various Artists, No Idea 100: Redefiling Music CD (No Idea Records, 2001)
Various Artists,  Sight And Sound: The History Of The Future video (No Idea Records, 2001)
Various Artists,  A Product Of Six Cents II  CD (A Product Of Six Cents, To Live A Lie Records, 2009)
Various Artists,  To Live A Lie Records 2010 Sampler CD (To Live A Lie Records, 2010)

External links 
Official No Idea Website

Hardcore punk groups from Florida
Musical groups from Gainesville, Florida
Musical groups established in 1995
1995 establishments in Florida